Château de Reichenberg is a late-19th and early 20th century château in the commune of Bergheim, in the department of Haut-Rhin, Alsace, France. It is a listed historical monument since 1995.

References

Châteaux in Haut-Rhin
Monuments historiques of Haut-Rhin